Romario Campbell (born 15 October 1989) is a Jamaican international footballer who plays for Mount Pleasant Football Academy, as a midfielder.

Career

Club 
Campbell currently plays for Mount Pleasant Football Academy in the  Red Stripe Premier League and has previously played for Humble Lions, Harbour View and Waterhouse.

International 

He made his international debut for Jamaica in 2010.

References

1989 births
Living people
Jamaican footballers
Jamaica international footballers
Association football midfielders
Harbour View F.C. players
Waterhouse F.C. players
2014 Caribbean Cup players
Mount Pleasant Football Academy players
Jamaica under-20 international footballers
Jamaica youth international footballers